WKUT-LD is a low-powered television station broadcast from.a transmitter located just north of Elizabethtown, Kentucky, United States. Owned by HC2 Holdings, the station serves as an Azteca América Owned-and-operated station, broadcasting on UHF channel 20, but through the use of PSIP, it is displayed on tuners as virtual channel 25. While the station is nominally licensed to Bowling Green, the station is actually based in Elizabethtown, Kentucky, and serving southern portions of the Louisville market.

History

As a TBN O&O translator
The station's construction permit was granted by the FCC on January 2, 2007. At that time, the station was originally licensed to Glasgow, Kentucky, located in Barren County, with the callsign WKUT-LP, broadcasting on analog UHF channel 64. The signal mainly reached most of Barren County, southern Hart County (including Horse Cave), and pathetically small areas of eastern Warren and southeast Edmonson Counties (e.g. Hays, Rocky Hill, Pondsville), and never reached the local media market's principal city Bowling Green proper. The current WKUT-LD calls were adopted on February 15, 2007 in an attempt to convert the station to digital. In 2010, the station went silent after being purchased by Budd Broadcasting, and the broadcast license was relocated to Bowling Green.

Before WKUT went silent, it was a low-powered owned-and-operated translator of TBN, the Trinity Broadcasting Network, simulcasting programming via satellite from network flagship KTBN-TV of Santa Ana, California. Currently, the nearest full-powered TBN station, however, is Hendersonville, Tennessee-licensed WPGD-TV. TBN also operated WKUW-LP on analog channel 60, which was also licensed to Glasgow, and at one time was licensed to Smiths Grove, until 2010 when they sold it to Budd Broadcasting, who relocated that station to White House, Tennessee, located within the Nashville media market, which is the home market for WPGD. WKUT served as a replacement for WKUG-LP, which was also a TBN O&O translator licensed to Glasgow and was broadcast on analog channel 62; that station operated from 2002 until 2007.

Currently, WPGD serves as the default over-the-air TBN station for the Bowling Green media market. TBN, along with its associated sister multi-cast networks (e.g. The Church Channel, JUCE TV, Smile of a Child TV), is widely available on virtually all cable television systems and on both major satellite TV providers (e.g. Dish Network and DirecTV). Some parts of the Bowling Green market could receive WPGD's signal with an antenna, mainly in Warren, Barren, and southern Butler Counties, along with parts of southern Edmonson County south of the Green River. Other than WPGD's southern Kentucky coverage, WCZU-LD's fourth digital subchannel with its carriage of the Sonlife Broadcasting Network, and Scottsville-licensed WPBM-CD, which technically is in the Nashville market, are currently Bowling Green's only local religious television outlets as they provide syndicated and locally produced religious programming.

Under DTV America ownership
In 2015, DTV America Corporation became the operator of both WKUT and WKUW-LD, with the license remaining with Budd Broadcasting. With DTV America elected as WKUT's operator, this made WKUT the in-market sister station to WCZU-LD. On July 17, 2015, DTV America took full control of both WKUT and WKUW and now owns and operates the station outright.

The elected site of WKUT-LD's new transmitter was located just off Blue Level Road on the western outskirts of Bowling Green just west of the Natcher Parkway (now Interstate 165), thus sharing tower space with FM radio translator station W248CF.

Under HC2 ownership
In October 2017, WKUT was one of several dozen stations to be purchased by HC2 Holdings, with DTV America remaining the operator of the station. In the same year, the station has filed a construction permit, which allowed the station to relocate to the Louisville market, electing to transmit the digital signal from a tower located along Springfield Road just east of Elizabethtown. The construction permit’s conditions also include the station to broadcast its digital signal on UHF channel 20 due to the channel repacking of the late-2010s. In 2019, HC2 decided to move WKUT's transmission facility to a tower located on Bee Knob Kill along Kentucky Route 1158 in southern Meade County in order for the newly-relaunched station to have the signal better serve the Louisville metro area.

On March 15, 2021, WKUT-LD officially returned to the air along with four additional subchannels. WKUT-LD became a Azteca América Owned-and-operated station and is playing its programming on the main channel of 25.1, hence making WKUT the first Spanish-language television station based in Kentucky. At the time of the launch, channels 25.2 and 25.4 aired Infomercials, 25.3 runs home shopping programming from Shop LC, and 25.5 runs programming from Sony Pictures Television's getTV network. Later on in Fall 2021, it's DT2 and DT4 subchannels respectively began to air programming from New Tang Dynasty Television and Novelisma. 

Azteca America will discontinue operations on December 31, 2022, and HC2's plans for WKUT's main channel are currently unknown. WKUT-LD5 switched to Timeless TV on January 1, 2023.

Digital channels

References

External links

DTV America
WKUT-LD Query on RECNet Database

KUT-LD
Television channels and stations established in 2007
Low-power television stations in the United States
Innovate Corp.
2007 establishments in Kentucky
Elizabethtown, Kentucky